Brazil Year 2000 is a 1969 Brazilian drama film directed by Walter Lima Jr.

Cast
 Anecy Rocha as Girl
 Ênio Gonçalves as Reporter
 Hélio Fernando as Son
 Iracema de Alencar as Mother
 Zbigniew Ziembinski as General (as Ziembinsky)
 Manfredo Colassanti as Man of the S.E.I.
 Arduíno Colassanti as Driver
 Rodolfo Arena as Priest
 Jackson De Souza as Politician
 Aizita Nascimento as Woman
 Raul Cortez as Man who protests

Production
Filming took place in 1968. The staff stayed three months in Paraty before moving to Rio de Janeiro for additional shooting in places such as the National Museum of Brazil and the Brazilian National Archives.

Reception
The film was entered into the 19th Berlin International Film Festival where it won a Silver Bear. It also won the Best Film Award at the 1970 Cartagena Film Festival and Best Director at the Manaus Film Festival.

References

External links

1960s science fiction drama films
1969 films
1969 drama films
Brazilian science fiction drama films
Films directed by Walter Lima Jr.
Films shot in Paraty
Films shot in Rio de Janeiro (city)
1960s Portuguese-language films